Dafney is a surname. Notable people with the name include:

 Bernard Dafney (1968–2006), American football player
 Dominique Dafney (born 1997), American football player

See also
 Daffney, ring name of American professional wrestler Shannon Spruill (1975–2021)
 Dafne (disambiguation)
 Daphne (disambiguation)